Carlos Augusto Soares da Costa Faria Carvalhal (born 4 December 1965) is a Portuguese former footballer who played as a centre-back, currently manager of La Liga club RC Celta de Vigo.

As a player, he totalled 197 Primeira Liga appearances in service of six clubs, including two spells each at Braga and Chaves, as well as a single game for Porto.

In a managerial career of over two decades, Carvalhal led eight teams in Portugal's top flight, including Braga twice, winning the Taça de Portugal in 2021. He reached the same final with Leixões in 2002 and won the Taça da Liga with Vitória de Setúbal in 2008. Abroad, he had spells in Greece, Turkey, England, Wales, the United Arab Emirates and Spain.

Playing career
Born in Braga, Carvalhal represented mainly his hometown's S.C. Braga during his career. In the 1987–88 campaign, in one of his three spells at the club, he had one of his best years in the Primeira Liga, appearing in 34 games and only being booked seven times, even though the Minho team could only finish in 11th position.

Immediately afterwards, Carvalhal joined FC Porto, but was released after only one year, going on to represent in the following nine seasons – until his retirement at the age of 32 – S.C. Beira-Mar, Braga, F.C. Tirsense, G.D. Chaves and S.C. Espinho.

Coaching career

Early career
Carvalhal began managing at his last club Espinho, in the Segunda Liga, being dismissed early into his second year. In 2002, he became the first coach in the country to take a team in the third division to the UEFA Cup, after leading Leixões S.C. to the final of the Taça de Portugal. Two years later, he helped Vitória F.C. back to the top flight, which prompted his move to a side in that tier, C.F. Os Belenenses.

Carvalhal was sacked by Belenenses early into 2005–06, after five defeats in eight games. He met the same fate with the two teams he coached the following season, Braga and S.C. Beira-Mar. With the latter, he was dismissed in December 2006 after the Aveiro club signed a cooperation deal with Inverfutbol, a Spanish-based sporting company, in a relegation-ending campaign.

Returning to Setúbal for 2007–08, Carvalhal enjoyed his best year as a manager. He led the Sadinos to the sixth position in the league – with the subsequent UEFA Cup qualification and with the team posting one of the best defensive records in Europe that year – and victory in the inaugural edition of the Taça da Liga, against Sporting CP.

Marítimo and Sporting CP
In May 2008, Carvalhal accepted the first foreign job of his career at Asteras Tripolis F.C. of Super League Greece, signing a two-year contract worth an annual salary of €500,000. He left by mutual consent in November with the club in 12th, having been warned by compatriot José Peseiro about the precarious nature of management in the Mediterranean country.

Carvalhal returned to Portugal and joined C.S. Marítimo, only winning one match in 11 but with the Madeira side finishing comfortably in mid-table. He was relieved of his duties late into the year 2009, moving to Sporting in mid-November to replace the fired Paulo Bento.

As originally intended, Carvalhal left his post at the end of the season, with Sporting finishing in fourth position, 28 points behind champions S.L. Benfica.

Turkey
On 2 August 2011, Carvalhal was appointed caretaker manager in Beşiktaş J.K. of Turkey, as incumbent Tayfur Havutçu resolved his legal issues stemming from the 2011 Turkish sports corruption scandal. At the start of the following April, with the team trailing Galatasaray S.K. by 20 points and him having fallen out with compatriot star player Ricardo Quaresma, he was relieved of his duties and replaced by his predecessor.

Remaining in the same city, Carvalhal was appointed at İstanbul Başakşehir F.K. also of the Süper Lig in May 2012. He resigned on 12 November, as they were in 14th place.

Sheffield Wednesday
On 30 June 2015, after nearly three years of inactivity, Carvalhal was appointed head coach of English Championship club Sheffield Wednesday. He led the team to sixth position in his debut campaign and, subsequently, qualified them for the play-offs, ultimately losing in the play-off final at Wembley. Another notable achievement in his first season in England was ousting Arsenal in the fourth round of the Football League Cup, with a 3–0 victory.

In May 2017, after leading Wednesday to a fourth-place league finish, Carvalhal became the first Portuguese to win the EFL Championship Manager of the Month award. He subsequently coached them to the play-offs, where they were defeated by Huddersfield Town on penalties.

Carvalhal left by mutual consent on 24 December 2017, as the side ranked in the lower half of the table.

Swansea City
On 28 December 2017, four days after leaving Sheffield Wednesday, he moved to the Premier League with Swansea City following the sacking of Paul Clement the previous week. His first game in charge took place late in the month, and he led his team to a 2–1 away win over Watford, led by compatriot Marco Silva. After two consecutive league home victories against Liverpool (1–0) and Arsenal (3–1), he was nominated for his first Premier League Manager of the Month award for the month of January.

On 18 May 2018, after the club's relegation, Carvalhal left the Liberty Stadium.

Return to Portugal
Carvalhal returned to Portugal one year later, being named Rio Ave FC's coach, In his only season, he led the team from Vila do Conde to Europa League qualification in fifth place, along with a best-ever points tally of 55.

On 28 July 2020, two days after leaving Rio Ave, Carvalhal signed a two-year contract at Braga in a return to the Estádio Municipal de Braga 14 years later. The following 23 January, his side lost the league cup final 1–0 to Sporting; both he and opposing manager Rúben Amorim were sent off for arguing with each other. He also reached the decisive match in the other domestic cup, winning 3–2 at Porto in the semi-finals second leg in spite of playing more than one hour with one player less; the final was a 2–0 victory over Benfica on 23 May.

Carvalhal was linked to Clube de Regatas do Flamengo in Brazil for the 2022 season, but would have faced a €10 million fine for not completing his Braga contract. Clube Atlético Mineiro in the same country managed to reduce that fee down to €8 million due to only months remaining on his deal, but still considered it to be too high. He again finished fourth in the Portuguese League, reaching the quarter-finals in the Europa League; on 16 May, he asked the board of directors to allow him to leave and "embrace a new project", and his wish was granted.

Al Wahda
Carvalhal was linked to a return to the English second tier, and was interviewed by Blackburn Rovers. However, on 1 June 2022 he signed a one-year deal at Al Wahda FC in the UAE Pro League. He was dismissed on 3 October, having won and drawn once each from four games of the new season.

Celta
On 2 November 2022, Carvalhal was appointed at RC Celta de Vigo after the sacking of Eduardo Coudet; he agreed to a contract until June 2024. In his first La Liga game three days later, he lost 2–1 at home to CA Osasuna.

Personal life
Carvalhal attended university alongside fellow coach Rui Faria, and studied for his UEFA Pro Licence alongside José Mourinho. He also authored the book Soccer: Developing a Know-How (2014), in which he discussed his own coaching philosophy.

Carvalhal studied Psychology and Philosophy at university. He was known for giving metaphorical and allegorical answers to questions in press conferences.

In July 2020, Carvalhal suffered light injuries in an attempted mugging when returning home to Braga after a match.

Managerial statistics

Honours

Manager
Leixões
Taça de Portugal runner-up: 2001–02
Supertaça Cândido de Oliveira runner-up: 2002

Setúbal
Taça da Liga: 2007–08

Braga
Taça de Portugal: 2020–21
Taça da Liga runner-up: 2020–21
Supertaça Cândido de Oliveira runner-up: 2021

Individual
Football League Cup Manager of the Tournament: 2015–16
EFL Championship Manager of the Month: May 2017

References

External links

1965 births
Living people
Sportspeople from Braga
Portuguese footballers
Association football defenders
Primeira Liga players
Liga Portugal 2 players
S.C. Braga players
G.D. Chaves players
FC Porto players
S.C. Beira-Mar players
F.C. Tirsense players
S.C. Espinho players
Portugal youth international footballers
Portugal under-21 international footballers
Portuguese football managers
Primeira Liga managers
Liga Portugal 2 managers
S.C. Freamunde managers
F.C. Vizela managers
C.D. Aves managers
Leixões S.C. managers
Vitória F.C. managers
C.F. Os Belenenses managers
S.C. Braga managers
S.C. Beira-Mar managers
C.S. Marítimo managers
Sporting CP managers
Rio Ave F.C. managers
Super League Greece managers
Asteras Tripolis F.C. managers
Süper Lig managers
Beşiktaş J.K. managers
İstanbul Başakşehir F.K. managers
Premier League managers
English Football League managers
Sheffield Wednesday F.C. managers
Swansea City A.F.C. managers
UAE Pro League managers
Al Wahda FC managers
La Liga managers
RC Celta de Vigo managers
Portuguese expatriate football managers
Expatriate football managers in Greece
Expatriate football managers in Turkey
Expatriate football managers in England
Expatriate football managers in Wales
Expatriate football managers in the United Arab Emirates
Expatriate football managers in Spain
Portuguese expatriate sportspeople in Greece
Portuguese expatriate sportspeople in Turkey
Portuguese expatriate sportspeople in England
Portuguese expatriate sportspeople in Wales
Portuguese expatriate sportspeople in the United Arab Emirates
Portuguese expatriate sportspeople in Spain